The year 1820 in archaeology involved some significant events.

Excavations
 First excavations of the Gallo-Roman site at Grand, Vosges.

Publications

  Narrative of the Operations and Recent Discoveries Within the Pyramids, Temples, Tombs, and Excavations in Egypt and Nubia by Giovanni Battista Belzoni.
 First volume of the American Antiquarian Society's Transactions. Includes map and descriptions of Mound Builders remains in Ohio by Caleb Atwater.

Finds
 April 8 - Venus de Milo (Aphrodite of Milos, c.150 BC-125 BC) is discovered on the island of Milos by a peasant named Yorgos Kentrotas.
 Statue of Ramesses II is discovered at the Great Temple of Ptah of Mit-Rahina near Memphis, Egypt by Giovanni Battista Caviglia.

Births
 March 23 - Canon William Greenwell, English archaeologist notable for his Grimes Graves excavations (died 1918).

References

Archaeology
Archaeology by year
Archaeology
Archaeology